Hilda Mary Woolnough  (February11, 1934 December12, 2007) was an artist with a wide range of media (drawing, printmaking, painting, sculpture) as well as a teacher, who exhibited her work worldwide. She lived in the artistic community of Breadalbane, Prince Edward Island, Canada.
Woolnough was an art activist and supported art institutions and young artists on P.E.I.

Early life 
Woolnough was born in Northampton, England in 1934, to a family with a long history of painters, including her mother, uncle and brother. Beginning traditional training at the Chelsea School of Art in London in 1952, and studying amongst a group of renowned artists, among them Ceri Richards and Henry Moore, she experimented with printmaking and graduated with her focus on painting in 1955. She married psychiatrist Dennis Hopkins and together they had three children, Daniel, Lee, and John. Emigrating to Canada in 1957, she settled in Hamilton, Ontario, but left in 1965 to go to San Miguel de Allende Instituto in Mexico to study experimental etching, graduating in 1967 with a focus in graphics and a Masters in Fine Arts. Returning to London, she enrolled in the Central School of Art and Design, where she did post-graduate technical art metal work.

Career 
In 1966-1967, Woolnough established an etching and lithography program at the Jamaica School of Art in Kingston, Jamaica. By this time, she had remarried Reshard Gool, a Canadian who founded a publication company known as Square Deal and wrote a best-selling novel, Cape Town Coolie. In 1969, Woolnough and Gool bought a home in Charlottetown, Prince Edward Island, and taught at the University of Prince Edward Island, while forming a vibrant art society and starting their own newspaper that failed only after a pro-radical Quebec separationist appearance in the paper created controversy. During the 1970s, Woolnough worked with native quilting, during the Native American craft revival. In 1972, she created her "Power Totem" series, then came her "Beach" series, and then later the "Wave/Rock" series, and her "Chrysalis" series. In 1975, came her "Ring Around the Rosy", a series of collographs, and later in the 1970s, she created the "Winter Squares" series. In 1977, Woolnough moved to Breadalbane, Prince Edward Island, a village north west of Charlottetown. She created her "Venus" series in 1978, and continued to explore the theme of women in the 1980s. In 1986, Woolnough created "Fishtales; A Marine Mythology", an exhibition curated by Joan Murray with a national tour (1987-1990). In the 1980s, she also worked in the crafts program at Holland College, in PEI. The Prince Edward Island Council of the Arts stated that, besides her career as an artist and arts advocate, she shared with her students her passion for the integration of design principles in handicraft design.

In 1989, her partner Reshard Gool died, and she and her family created a provincial scholarship for Prince Edward Island students in his honour. In 2001, her exhibition Timepiece, which showed at the Confederation Centre Art Gallery, featured sculpture, sound environments, and complex multilayered prints, accompanied by a book by Linda Rae Dornan. One of Woolnough's final projects, in conjunction with Amnesty International, concerned the crisis at the Guantanamo Bay detention camp. Titled Guantánamo (2004-2005), the 12-piece show, with a large multi-paneled theatrical installation fifteen metres long, toured worldwide, including in Japan. In it, she developed her ongoing interest in the human figure into a major political statement about injustice.

Woolnough was a driving force in many artistic organizations in Prince Edward Island, including galleries and the PEI Printmakers’ Council, the P.E.I. Council of the Arts, and the Arts Guild. After her death from cancer on 12 December 2007, at age 73, the Hilda Woolnough Memorial Scholarship was founded in her memory. In 2013, the Confederation Centre Art Gallery in Charlottetown presented a retrospective of her work in recognition of her contributions as an artist and arts advocate on Prince Edward Island. As stated by the Prince Edward Island Council of the Arts, Woolnough "has left a wonderful legacy for artists both on the Island and throughout Canada."

Honours
Woolnough received the Father Adrien Arsenault Senior Arts Award recognizing achievement as a Prince Edward Island artist in 1999, and was elected to the Royal Canadian Academy in 2000.

Collections

Woolnough's work is in the following collections:
Art Gallery of Jamaica 
Art Gallery of Nova Scotia 
Art Gallery of Ontario
The Confederation Centre Art Gallery 
Gotland Museum, Visby, Sweden 
Memorial University Art Gallery, St. John's, Newfoundland 
Montreal Museum of Fine Arts
New Brunswick Art Gallery and Museum, St. John, NB 
Robert McLaughlin Gallery, Oshawa, Ontario
Canada Council Art Bank
Air Canada, Montreal, Quebec

References

Bibliography
 

1934 births
2007 deaths
20th-century English women artists
21st-century English women artists
Alumni of the Central School of Art and Design
Alumni of Chelsea College of Arts
Artists from Northampton
Members of the Royal Canadian Academy of Arts
English emigrants to Canada
Canadian art educators